Virginia Johnson (born 1950) is an American ballet dancer, choreographer, and journalist. She currently serves as the artistic director of Dance Theatre of Harlem and is a founding member and former principal dancer of the company. From 2000 to 2009 she was the editor-in-chief of Pointe.

Early life 
Johnson was born and raised in Washington, D.C. She began training in classical ballet at the age of three under Therrell Smith, a friend of her mother's who had trained under Mathilde Kschessinska. When she was thirteen years old she was accepted as a scholarship student at The Washington School of Ballet, where she trained under Mary Day and was the only African-American student. She graduated from the school in 1968.

Career 
Johnson moved to New York City and enrolled as a dance major at New York University. While a student there, she took a class with Arthur Mitchell and was invited to help start a ballet company with him. She became a founding member of Dance Theatre of Harlem in 1969 and was promoted to the rank of principal dancer. She danced lead roles in Agon, A Streetcar Named Desire, Creole Giselle, Concerto Barocco, Allegro Brillante, Fall River Legend, Swan Lake, Les Biches, and Glen Tetley's Voluntaries.

After a twenty-eight year career with the company, Johnson retired and enrolled as a communications student at Fordham University. She was later hired as the inaugural editor-in-chief of Pointe Magazine and served in that capacity from 2000 until she left in 2009 to become the artistic director of Dance Theatre of Harlem.

References 

Living people
1950 births
African-American ballet dancers
African-American female dancers
American ballerinas
American magazine editors
African-American women journalists
African-American journalists
American women choreographers
American choreographers
Artistic directors
Dance Theatre of Harlem dancers
Dancers from Washington, D.C.
Women magazine editors
New York University alumni
Fordham University alumni
Journalists from Washington, D.C.